Cirujeda is a village in Teruel, Aragón, Spain. It is part of the municipality of Aliaga.

References

Towns in Spain
Populated places in the Province of Teruel
Province of Teruel